Isoborneol is a bicyclic organic compound and a terpene derivative. The hydroxyl group in this compound is placed in an exo position. The endo diastereomer is called borneol. Being chiral, isoborneol exists as enantiomers.

Preparation
Isoborneol is synthesized commercially by hydrolysis of isobornyl acetate.  The latter is obtained from treatment of camphene with acetic acid in the presence of a strong acid catalyst.

It can also be produced by reduction of camphor:

Isoborneol derivatives as chiral ligands 
Derivatives of isoborneol are used as ligands in asymmetric synthesis.
 (2S)-(−)-3-exo-(morpholino)isoborneol or MIB with a morpholine substituent in the α-hydroxyl position.
 (2S)-(−)-3-exo-(dimethylamino)isoborneol or DAIB with a dimethylamino substituent in the α-hydroxyl position

References

Secondary alcohols
Monoterpenes
Bicyclic compounds
Cyclopentanes